Our Gang was a series of American comedy short films originally released between 1922 and 1944.

Our Gang may also refer to:

 Our Gang (film), 1922 silent short subject
 Our Gang (novel), Philip Roth novel
 "Our Gang" (The Cleveland Show), episode of The Cleveland Show
 Spanky and Our Gang, a 1960s folk-rock band with several charted singles

See also
 Our Crowd: The Great Jewish Families of New York, a history book by Stephen Birmingham
 Our Gang personnel,  cast and crew of the Our Gang short film series